Smithers Creek is a tributary of the Kanawha River,  long, in southern West Virginia in the United States. The creek flows for its entire length in western Fayette County; its tributaries additionally drain a portion of eastern Kanawha County.

Smithers Creek rises in the unincorporated community of Mount Olive and flows generally southwestward through the unincorporated communities of Marting and Cannelton, to the city of Smithers, where it flows into the Kanawha River.  The creek is paralleled by a county road for most of its course.

The Geographic Names Information System lists "Smothers Creek," "Smuthers Creek," and "Smythers Creek" as historical variant names for the creek.

See also
List of rivers of West Virginia

References 

Rivers of West Virginia
Rivers of Fayette County, West Virginia
Tributaries of the Kanawha River